The 2015 NCAA Division I Women's Lacrosse Championship was the 34th annual single-elimination tournament to determine the national champion of Division I NCAA women's college lacrosse. For the first time, the semifinal and championship rounds were played at PPL Park (the home of the Philadelphia Union of the MLS) in Chester, Pennsylvania from May 22–24, 2015.

Maryland defeated North Carolina in the final, 9–8, to win their twelfth national title.

Tournament field
All NCAA Division I women's lacrosse programs were eligible for this championship, and a total of 26 teams were invited to participate. 13 teams qualified automatically by winning their conference tournaments while the remaining 13 teams qualified at-large based on their regular season records.

Seeds

1. Maryland (17-1)
2. North Carolina (15-3)
3. Duke (14-4)
4. Syracuse (14-7)
5. Boston College (15-3)
6. Stony Brook (18-1)
7. Virginia (11-6)
8. Northwestern (12-6)

Teams

Bracket

See also 
 NCAA Division II Women's Lacrosse Championship 
 NCAA Division III Women's Lacrosse Championship
 2015 NCAA Division I Men's Lacrosse Championship

References

NCAA Division I Women's Lacrosse Championship
 
NCAA Women's Lacrosse Championship
NCAA Division I Women's Lacrosse